Linsenhoff is a surname. Notable people with the surname include:

Ann-Kathrin Linsenhoff (born 1960), German equestrian and Olympic champion
Liselott Linsenhoff (1927–1999), German equestrian and Olympic champion
Viktoria Schmidt-Linsenhoff (1944–2013), German art historian and professor